A skyquake is a phenomenon where a loud booming sound is reported to originate from the sky. The sound may cause noticeable vibration in a building or across a particular area. Those who experience skyquakes typically do not have a clear explanation for what caused them and they are perceived as mysterious.

They have been heard in several locations around the world, including the banks of the river Ganges, Marwadi/Marawadi (मरवड़ी/मराड़ी) village in Himachal Pradesh, the East Coast and inland Finger Lakes of the United States, the city of Hudson, Wisconsin, the Magic Valley in south-central Idaho, Colombia, Southern Canada, as well as areas of the North Sea, Japan, Finland, Australia, Italy, Ireland, India, The Netherlands, Norway, Tierra del Fuego in Argentina, the United Kingdom, Mexico, Jakarta, and Java.

Local names
Names (according to area) are:
Bangladesh: Barisal Guns
 France: "bombes de mer", "canons de mer".
Indonesia: dentuman (lit: "clatter") or suara tembakan meriam (lit: "the sound of cannon fire").
Italy: "brontidi", "marina", "balza", "lagoni", "bomba", "rombo", "boato", "bonnito", "mugghio", "baturlio", "tromba", "rufa".,
Japan: "uminari" (literally, "cries from the sea")
Netherlands and Belgium: "mistpoeffers", "zeepoeffers", "zeedoffers", "mistbommen", "gonzen", "balken", "onderaardse geruchten".
Philippines and Iran: "retumbos"
United States: "Guns of the Seneca" around Seneca Lake and Cayuga Lake, Seneca guns in the Southeast US
Latin America and Spain: "cielomoto"
elsewhere:  "fog guns", "mistpouffers", "waterguns"

They have been reported from an Adriatic island in 1824; Western Australia, South Australia and Victoria in Australia; Belgium; frequently on calm summer days in the Bay of Fundy, Canada; Lough Neagh in Northern Ireland; Scotland; Passamaquoddy Bay, New Brunswick; Cedar Keys, Florida; Franklinville, New York in 1896; and northern Georgia in the United States.

Their sound has been described as being like distant but inordinately loud thunder while no clouds are in the sky large enough to generate lightning. Those familiar with the sound of cannon fire say the sound is nearly identical. The booms occasionally cause shock waves that rattle plates. Early white settlers in North America were told by the native Haudenosaunee Iroquois that the booms were the sound of the Great Spirit continuing his work of shaping the earth.

The terms "mistpouffers" and "Seneca guns" both originate in Seneca Lake, NY, and refer to the rumble of artillery fire. James Fenimore Cooper, author of The Last of the Mohicans, wrote "The Lake Gun" in 1850, a short story describing the phenomenon heard at Seneca Lake, which seems to have popularized the terms.

Hypotheses
Their origin has not been positively identified. They have been explained as:
Coronal mass ejection CMEs often generate shock waves similar to what happens when an aircraft flies at a speed higher than the speed of sound in Earth's atmosphere (sonic boom). The solar wind's equivalent of a sonic boom can accelerate protons up to millions of miles per minute—as much as 40 percent of the speed of light.
Meteors entering the atmosphere causing sonic booms.
Gas:
Gas escaping from vents in the Earth's surface.
With lakes, bio gas from decaying vegetation trapped beneath the lake bottoms suddenly bursting forth. This is plausible, since Cayuga Lake and Seneca Lake are two large and deep lakes.
Explosive release of less volatile gases generated as limestone decays in underwater caves.
Military aircraft creating sonic booms (though this origin cannot explain occurrences before supersonic flight started).
Shallow earthquakes can generate sound waves with little ground vibration. The "booming" sound is heard only in a localized area around the epicenter.  
Underwater caves collapsing, and the air rapidly rising to the surface.
 Possible resonance from solar and/or earth magnetic activity inducing sounds.
 Volcanic eruptions
 Weather
 Earthquake
 Avalanches, either natural or human-made for avalanche control.
 Atmospheric ducting where distant thunder or other sounds are propagated across long distances due to travel through distinct atmospheric layers.

See also 

 Bell Island Boom, attributed to a lightning superbolt
 List of meteor air bursts
 List of unexplained sounds
 Electrophonic hearing

References

Unidentified sounds
Earth mysteries
Natural disasters
Types of earthquake
Unexplained phenomena